The Mercedes-Benz M10 engine is a naturally-aspirated, 3.4-liter to 3.7-liter, straight-6, internal combustion piston engine, designed, developed and produced by Mercedes-Benz; between 1929 and 1933.

Applications
Mercedes-Benz W10

References

Mercedes-Benz engines
Straight-six engines
Engines by model
Gasoline engines by model